Planet of the Spiders is the fifth and final serial of the 11th season of the British science fiction television series Doctor Who, which was first broadcast in six weekly parts on BBC1 from 4 May to 8 June 1974. It was Jon Pertwee's final regular appearance as the Third Doctor, the last regular appearance of Mike Yates, and marks the first, uncredited appearance of Tom Baker as the Fourth Doctor. This serial introduces the term "regenerate" to explain the Doctor's transformation into another appearance.

The serial is set in England and on the planet Metebelis Three. In the serial, the fired salesman Lupton (John Dearth) allies with a race of psychic spiders called the Eight-Legs to gain power.

Plot

Following the events of Invasion of the Dinosaurs, Mike Yates was discharged from UNIT and is now attending a Tibetan meditation centre in rural England. Sarah Jane Smith visits him and they witness some curious events, seemingly organised by a resident called Lupton, and his cronies. Mike and Sarah stumble across Lupton performing an incantation, which conjures up a giant spider. It jumps on Lupton’s back and then disappears. The spider manifests itself in Lupton’s head, telling him to seek out and locate a certain blue crystal.

The Third Doctor has developed an interest in psychic ability, but his testing of a clairvoyant called Professor Clegg backfires when his subject has a fatal heart attack. It is triggered when Clegg comes into contact with a blue crystal from Metebelis Three (sent back from the Amazon by Jo Grant), which caused him to see the image of deadly spiders. Sarah returns from the retreat, and she and the Doctor swap spider tales. Meanwhile, Lupton has also arrived at UNIT HQ and steals the crystal from the Doctor’s laboratory. A multi-vehicle chase ensues, which Lupton escapes by teleporting back to the monastery. There, the spider reveals that it is plotting against some of its sisters back on Metebelis Three. The spiders and the crystal originate from the same blue planet in the Acteon Galaxy the Doctor last visited during The Green Death.

The Doctor and Sarah make for the monastery and tell the deputy abbot, Cho-je, that something is very amiss. The crystal is taken by Tommy, a handyman with learning difficulties, whose mind is opened by the crystal's power. Lupton is teleported to Metebelis Three, unwittingly allowing Sarah to follow him. She meets the human slave inhabitants of the planet, a generally dispirited bunch, other than the rebellious Arak, who is in hiding.

The planet is ruled by the Eight-Legs or giant spiders, and their Queen is the supreme ruler. They govern using guards chosen from among the planet's Two-Leg (human) population and their own phenomenal mental powers, amplified by the blue stones of the planet. The Doctor arrives and meets Arak, who explains that the Metebelians are the descendants of the crew of an Earth space ship, which crashed hundreds of years before. A spider on board found its way to the Blue Mountains where, through the effect of the crystals, its progeny grew larger and cleverer. The Doctor works out that a “negative” stone can absorb and reject the power of the blue crystals. He starts a revolt among the humans, now protected by these stones, but this is not effective. The Doctor explores the Blue Mountains and encounters the Great One, an enormous spider that controls Metebelis and desires power over other domains, too. She craves the crystal, as it will complete a lattice of hundreds of similar crystals on her web and magnify her mental powers immensely. She knows the crystal is still on Earth and sends the Doctor there to get it for her. He flees back to Earth with Sarah, not knowing the Queen spider has now implanted itself in his companion's mind.

Tommy has given the crystal to the abbot, K’anpo Rimpoche, who is an elderly Time Lord and the one-time hermit mentor of the Doctor. He now lives in peaceful exile on Earth. He tells the Doctor of Sarah's control, and they work together to expel the Queen Spider. A fight breaks out in the monastery between Lupton’s cronies and Tommy. The Abbot advises the Doctor to take the crystal to the Great One. He suggests that, as the Doctor started this chain of events by removing the crystal in the first place, it is up to him to put it back. He departs in the TARDIS with the crystal.

On Metebelis Three, Lupton is killed by the spiders after falling out with the council. When the TARDIS lands, the Doctor heads to the cave of the Great One with the crystal. He warns her of the danger of completing the lattice but she does so, anyway. The forces unleashed are too strong for the Great One, and the positive feedback causes agonizing deaths to her and the other spiders. A vast wave of deadly radiation floods the cave. The Doctor, now very weak, staggers back to the TARDIS.

Weeks later, Brigadier Lethbridge-Stewart and Sarah are in the Doctor's laboratory when the TARDIS materialises, and on exiting it the Doctor collapses on the floor. The abbot K’anpo arrives in his new body, having regenerated into the form of Cho-je, who was a sort of forward projection of his soul. He tells them that the Doctor will change too and before their eyes the Doctor regenerates into his fourth incarnation.

Production
The final story of Season 11 (to have been titled The Final Game) was originally intended to write out the character of the Master (played by the recently deceased Roger Delgado), with the villainous Time Lord sacrificing his life to save the Doctor. The railway station at which Sarah Jane arrives in Part One is Mortimer, near Reading. Producer and director Barry Letts later said in an interview in 2004 that he was unhappy with the scenes on Metebelis, which "never looked right".

Cast notes
Ysanne Churchman had provided the voice of Alpha Centauri in both The Curse of Peladon (1972) and its sequel The Monster of Peladon (the serial immediately preceding Planet of the Spiders); she would briefly reprise the role in "Empress of Mars" (2017). Kismet Delgado, the widow of Roger Delgado, was one of the voices for the Spiders. Carl Forgione would later play Nimrod in Ghost Light (1989). Christopher Burgess had previously played Swann in The Enemy of the World (1968). Cyril Shaps who played Professor Clegg had previously appeared in The Tomb of the Cybermen and The Ambassadors of Death and would later star in The Androids of Tara.  Kevin Lindsay had previously appeared in The Time Warrior as the Sontaran, Linx.    John Dearth had provided the voice of the computer, BOSS, in The Green Death (1973).

Broadcast and reception

The story was edited and condensed into a single omnibus episode broadcast on BBC1 at 2:45 pm on 27 December 1974, reaching 8.6 million viewers. The compilation was included on the DVD release of the complete story.

Paul Cornell, Martin Day, and Keith Topping wrote of the serial in The Discontinuity Guide (1995), "Grotesquely over padded and stuck with bad CSO, Planet of the Spiders is not the celebration of an era that it should have been." However, they felt that the regeneration scene "almost atones for this". In 2010, Patrick Mulkern of Radio Times awarded it four stars out of five. He praised the regeneration and wrote that the story was "fun". He noted that some of the cliffhangers were "unusually feeble", but the first was one of the best. DVD Talk's John Sinnott gave the story three out of five stars, writing that it was "enjoyable" despite "not the great sendoff that Pertwee should have received" with padding and weak special effects. Reviewing the serial for SFX, Ian Berriman rated the serial three and a half out of five stars and described it as "a mix of the fresh and the hokey". While he noted that some of the plot was repetitive and traditional, he praised the inclusion of Buddhism. In 2010, Alasdair Wilkins of io9 called the story a "mash-up of a bunch of different types of Third Doctor stories", but the plot was not enough to stretch out over six episodes and so a lot of unnecessary elements were added. However, Wilkins felt that it was a good thematic end for the Third Doctor, and named it the third best regeneration of the Doctor but the third worst regeneration story. In 2009, SFX listed Sarah Jane with the spider on her back as the tenth scariest Doctor Who moment.

Commercial releases

In print

A novelisation of this serial, written by Terrance Dicks, was published by Target Books in October 1975 as Doctor Who and the Planet of the Spiders. The novel's prologue shows Jo Grant and her husband Professor Jones in the Amazon jungle following the events of The Green Death. Harry Sullivan is referred to as Doctor Sweetman.

Home media
The serial was released on VHS in April 1991 as a double pack. It was released on DVD in the UK on 18 April 2011, and in the USA and Canada on 10 May 2011. This serial was also released as part of the Doctor Who DVD Files in Issue 110 on 20 March 2013.

References

External links

That Doctor Who Episode with the Hovercraft Chase: A Retrospective — A tongue-in-cheek analysis of Planet of the Spiders Part Two.
Planet of the Spiders on BBCWorldwideTV YouTube channel

Target novelisation

Third Doctor serials
Doctor Who serials novelised by Terrance Dicks
1974 British television episodes
Fourth Doctor serials
Spiders in popular culture
Doctor Who regeneration stories